The Utica–Rome Metropolitan Statistical Area, as defined by the United States Census Bureau, is an area consisting of two counties in Central New York anchored by the cities of Utica and Rome (both in Oneida County). As of the 2020 census, the MSA had a population of 292,264.

Counties
Oneida (not to be confused with the city of Oneida, New York in the neighbouring Madison County)
Herkimer

Communities

Places with more than 30,000 inhabitants
Utica (Principal city) 
Rome (Principal city)

Places with 10,000 to 30,000 inhabitants
German Flatts (town)
Kirkland (town) 
New Hartford (town) 
Whitestown (town)
Herkimer (town)

Places with 5,000 to 10,000 inhabitants
Camden (town) 
Frankfort (town) 
Herkimer (village) 
Ilion (village)
Lee (town) 
Little Falls (city) 
Marcy (town) 
Vernon (town) 
Verona (town) 
Vienna (town) 
Westmoreland (town)

Places with 1,000 to 5,000 inhabitants

Annsville (town) 
Augusta (town) 
Boonville (town) 
Boonville (village) 
Bridgewater (town) 
Camden (village) 
Clark Mills (census-designated place)
Clinton (village) 
Columbia (town) 
Danube (town) 
Deerfield (town) 
Dolgeville (village; partial) 
Fairfield (town) 
Florence (town) 
Floyd (town) 
Forestport (town)
Frankfort (village) 
Litchfield (town)
Little Falls (town) 
Manheim (town) 
Marshall (town) 
Mohawk (village) 

New Hartford (village) 
New York Mills (village) 
Newport (town) 
Oriskany (village) 
Paris (town) 
Remsen (town) 
Russia (town)
Salisbury (town)
Sangerfield (town) 
Schuyler (town)
Sherrill (city) 
Steuben (town) 
Sylvan Beach (village) 
Trenton (town) 
Vernon (village) 
Warren (town) 
Waterville (village) 
Webb (town) 
Western (town) 
Whitesboro (village) 
Winfield (town)
Yorkville  (village)

Places with less than 1,000 inhabitants
Ava (town) 
Barneveld (village) 
Bridgewater (village) 
Clayville (village)
Cold Brook (village) 
Holland Patent (village) 
Middleville (village) 
Newport (village) 
Norway (town) 
Ohio (town) 
Oneida Castle (village) 
Oriskany Falls (village) 
Poland (village) 
Prospect (village) 
Remsen (village)
Stark (town) 
West Winfield (village)

Hamlets
Jordanville
McConnellsville
Old Forge
Sauquoit
Thendara

Demographics
As of the census of 2020, there were 299,896 people residing within the MSA. The racial makeup of the MSA was 82.2% White, 5.8% African American, 0.3% Native American, 3.8% Asian, 0.1%< Pacific Islander, 2.2% from other races, and 5.7% from two or more races. Hispanic or Latino of any race were 5.7% of the population.

In 2000, The median income for a household in the MSA was $34,417, and the median income for a family was $42,956. Males had a median income of $31,051 versus $22,907 for females. The per capita income for the MSA was $17,329.

Colleges and universities

Herkimer County
Herkimer County Community College, in Herkimer
Oneida County
Hamilton College, in Clinton
Mohawk Valley Community College, in Rome and Utica
State University of New York Polytechnic Institute, in Marcy
In Utica:
Empire State College
St. Elizabeth College of Nursing
Utica University

See also
New York census statistical areas

References

 
Geography of Herkimer County, New York
Geography of Oneida County, New York